Turtle Bayou is an  Unincorporated community in Chambers County, Texas, United States.  During the Texas Revolution, it was the site of the Turtle Bayou Resolutions.

Education
Anahuac Independent School District operates schools in the area.

External links

Unincorporated communities in Chambers County, Texas
Unincorporated communities in Texas